The 1988–1989 Balkans Cup was an edition of the Balkans Cup, a football competition for representative clubs from the Balkan states. It was contested by 6 teams and OFI won the trophy.

Group A

Group B

Final

References

External links 

 RSSSF Archive → Balkans Cup
 
 Mehmet Çelik. "Balkan Cup". Turkish Soccer

1988
1988–89 in European football
1988–89 in Romanian football
1988–89 in Greek football
1988–89 in Bulgarian football
1988–89 in Turkish football
1988–89 in Yugoslav football
1988–89 in Albanian football